Mirik Lake, or Sumendu Lake, is a lake in Mirik, Darjeeling district, West Bengal, India.

See also 
Chowrasta Darjeeling

References

Lakes of West Bengal
Tourist attractions in Darjeeling district